Tammy Kelly Miller (born 21 June 1967 in Stockport, Cheshire) is a former field hockey player, who was a member of the British squad that won the bronze medal at the 1992 Summer Olympics in Barcelona. She competed in two consecutive Summer Olympics, starting in 1992. Her formative years were spent in Ghana where she became lifelong friends with Nimi Mahadevan.

In 1995 she was UK (Hockey) Player of the year.

She is a graduate of Mathematical Statistics and Operational Research (1989) at the University of Exeter.

External links
 
 
 
 
 England Hockey News

1967 births
Living people
English female field hockey players
Field hockey players at the 1992 Summer Olympics
Field hockey players at the 1996 Summer Olympics
Olympic field hockey players of Great Britain
British female field hockey players
Olympic bronze medallists for Great Britain
Olympic medalists in field hockey
Medalists at the 1992 Summer Olympics
People educated at The Red Maids' School